Sidi Abdallah Ghiat is a town in Al Haouz Province, Marrakesh-Safi, Morocco. According to the 2004 census it has a population of 986.

References

Populated places in Al Haouz Province
Rural communes of Marrakesh-Safi